The Ecoles Centrales Group is an alliance, consisting of following grandes écoles of engineering:
 CentraleSupélec (formed by merger of École Centrale Paris and Supélec) established in 2015
 École centrale de Lille established in 1854
 École centrale de Lyon established in 1857
 École centrale de Marseille established in 1890
 École centrale de Nantes established in 1919
 École centrale de Pékin in China, established in 2005.
 École centrale de Casablanca in Morocco, established in 2013
 Mahindra École Centrale in Hyderabad, India, established in 2014

The Group contributes to the harmonisation of academic programs, the sharing of experiences, and collaboration in international relations. A key stakeholder in corporate development, the Écoles Centrales Group has established a reputation as a global reference point in the education of the generalist engineers of tomorrow.

With about 6,000 graduate engineer students and 800 PhD doctorate students, a total faculty of 700 permanent academic members, 2200 part-time lecturers and associate professors, 450 technical and administrative staff, 2000 researchers, the Ecoles Centrales Group annually approves hundreds of PhD doctorate dissertations and grants 1500 Centrale graduate engineering degrees and other master's degrees. Already more than 35,000 Centrale alumni are active today in business, entrepreneurship, research & development, and management in small and large industries worldwide.

Goals 

 multidisciplinary curriculum for engineers, with a broad scope of scientific, engineering and management fields taught to all students (civil engineering; mechanical engineering; electrical engineering; information theory & computer science; control science and signal processing; telecom; chemistry, physics and material sciences; micro-nano technologies; manufacturing; safety, logistics; mathematics; economics; statistics, finance; management ...) applicable for French-speaking students with a solid scientific background knowledge and intellectual agility;
 first two years for acquisition of a Centrale common body of knowledges, with core and elective thematic flexibility, and at least one year of in-depth thematic studies at the end of the programme ;
 close contact with the industry through joint projects and training periods, and requirements for international exposure ;
 academic education and applied research closely related to industry stakeholders.

Admission 

Education programmes implemented in CentraleSupélec, Lille, Lyon, Marseille and Nantes include
 Ingénieur Centralien (Centrale graduate engineering degree)
 Masters and PhD doctorate studies
 Specialized masters (Mastère MS Spécialisé)

The Centrale Programme (Centrale graduate engineering degree - Grade 300 ECTS) includes a three or four-year curriculum. Application to the Centrale Programme is possible after two/three year undergraduate studies in other educational institutes.  
Admission to an école centrale requires success in either: 
 a French nationwide selective exam with numerus clausus : concours Centrale-Supelec, with examination centres located throughout France  and in Lebanon, Morocco, Tunisia;
 an entrance exam for Bachelor of Science : CASTing - Concours d'Admission sur Titre Ingénieur ;
 a selection process as per  TIME double degrees procedures applicable in Europe ;
 a selection process as per TIME Overseas double degree procedures applicable for selected universities in Brasil, Canada, Chile, China, Indonesia, Japan, USA ;
 a specific application process for other international students presented by their originating University.
Thus undergraduate studies + the Centralien Programme account for more than a cumulated 300   ECTS credit in the European education system.

Admission to the master's degree programme (workload is either M1+M2 = 120  ECTS or M2 = 60  ECTS) is possible upon application assessment based on academic criteria or is possible as a part of the Centralien Programme.
Several master's degrees are available from the different écoles centrales and may be taught in English and/or French, targeting diverse science and engineering domains :
 Master's degrees at Centrale Lille
 Master's degrees at Centrale Lyon
  Master's degrees at Centrale Marseille
 Master's degrees at Centrale Nantes
 Master's degrees at Centrale Paris

Admission to specialized master's degree programmes (Mastère spécialisé) for master's-level specialization and continuing education in specific engineering and management fields (workload is 75  ECTS) is possible upon application assessment based on candidate profile.
MS taught in French include : 
 MS Centrale Lille
 MS Centrale Lyon
 MS Centrale Marseille
 MS Centrale Nantes
 MS Centrale Paris

Research labs 

PhD candidates and visiting researchers should contact directly their preferred labs among 38 different research labs of the Ecoles Centrales.

CARNOT Institute affiliations :
 CentraleSupélec labs are a member of CARNOT C3S Institute.
 Ecole Centrale de Lille labs are a member of CARNOT ARTS Institute.
 Ecole Centrale de Lyon labs are a member of CARNOT i@L Institute.

See also
 TIME Network

References 

 Groupe Centrale brochure (in French)
 Information at one member school (in English)
 Top Industrial Managers for Europe (TIME network)

 
Multidisciplinary research institutes
1990 establishments in France